Sikhounxay Ounkhamphanyavong (born November 18, 1982) is a Laotian swimmer.

Described as "the big name of Laotian swimming", he represented his country at the 2000 Summer Olympics in Sydney, in the men's 50 metre freestyle. He had trained in one of the world's poorest countries, "where the largest pool is 25 meters long – half the Olympic distance". A reporter for the Australian Broadcasting Corporation noted that "a 25m pool badly in need of cleaning is [his] only place to train." Ounkhamphanyavong finished last in his heat, with a time of 27.03, and did not advance to the semi-finals.

References
sports-reference

External links
 

1982 births
Living people
Laotian male freestyle swimmers
Olympic swimmers of Laos
Swimmers at the 2000 Summer Olympics